The 2010 European Archery Championships is  the 21st edition of the European Archery Championships. The event was held in Rovereto, Italy from 25 to 29 May, 2010. It was the first time at the championships that a mixed competition was held.

Medal table

Medal summary

Recurve

Compound

References

External links
 Results

European Archery Championships
2010 in archery
International archery competitions hosted by Italy
2010 in Italian sport
2010 in European sport